Tata is a province in the Moroccan economic region of Souss-Massa. Its population in 2004 was 121,618. 

The major cities and towns are: 
 Akka
 Fam El Hisn
 Foum Zguid
 Tata

Subdivisions
The province is divided administratively into the following:

References

 
Tata Province